Márcio Rezende de Freitas (born December 22, 1960 in Timóteo) is a former Brazilian football (soccer) referee. He has refereed more than 1100 games, 269 of these in national championships, between 1989 and 2005. He was present in the World Championship and at the Olympic Games. He was considered, in 2004, one of the 10 best referees in the universe.

References
 Profile

1960 births
Living people
People from Minas Gerais
Brazilian football referees
FIFA World Cup referees
Copa América referees
Olympic football referees
1998 FIFA World Cup referees
Place of birth missing (living people)